Loubo Augustin Djessou (born 1917 in Soubre, Cote d'Ivoire; died 29 November 1986) was a politician from Cote d'Ivoire who served in the French Senate from 1955 to 1958.

References 
 page on the French Senate website

Ivorian politicians
French Senators of the Fourth Republic
1917 births
1986 deaths
People from Bas-Sassandra District
People of French West Africa
Senators of French West Africa
Ivorian expatriates in France